Khong or  Khang or Khank or Khung or Khonog may refer to:
 Khong, Fars
 Khong-e Pir Sabz, Fars Province
 Khong Azhdar, Khuzestan Province
 Khong Azhdar-e Ali Ayavel, Khuzestan Province
 Khong Kamalvand, Khuzestan Province
 Khong Karam Alivand, Khuzestan Province
 Khong Yar Alivand, Khuzestan Province
 Khong, Kohgiluyeh and Boyer-Ahmad
 Khung, Razavi Khorasan
 Khong, South Khorasan
 Khong-e Bala, South Khorasan